Lachin International Airport is an airport under construction in Lachin, Azerbaijan. The construction of the airport began in May 2021 and is expected to be completed in 2024. It will be the highest altitude airport in Azerbaijan at 1,700-1,800 meters above sea level. The Lachin International Airport will be Azerbaijan's third air harbor in the areas gained in the 2020 Nagorno-Karabakh war, in addition to the international airports in the Fuzuli and Zangilan districts. The airport will be located at the Qorçu village of the Lachin district, slightly more than 30 and 60 kilometers from Lachin and Kalbajar cities, respectively, and about 70 kilometers from Shusha city.

See also
Fuzuli International Airport
Zangilan International Airport
Azerbaijani construction in areas gained in the 2020 Nagorno-Karabakh war

References 

Buildings and structures in Azerbaijan
Airports in Azerbaijan
Lachin District